Agostini is an Italian surname. Notable people with the surname include:

Angelo Agostini Mazzinghi, Blessed (1385-1438), Italian Roman Catholic priest and a professed member of the Carmelite order
Agostino Agostini (died 1569), Italian singer, composer and priest of Ferrara mostly active in the 1540s
Paolo Agostini (1583-1629), Italian composer and organist of the early Baroque era
Lodovico Agostini (1534–1590), Italian composer
Leonardo Agostini (1593–1669), Italian antiquary
Stefano Agostini (cardinal) (1614–1683), Italian Roman Catholic cardinal
Domenico Agostini (1825—1891), Italian Roman Catholic Cardinal and Patriarch of Venice 
Zefirino Agostini, Blessed (1813-1896), Italian Roman Catholic priest
Angelo Agostini (1843–1910), Italian-Brazilian journalist and cartoonist
Angela Agostini (1880-?), Italian botanist and mycologist
Carlo Agostini (1888–1952), Italian Roman Catholic Patriarch of Venice 
Agostini Lanfranchi (1892-1963), Italian bobsledder
Amedeo Agostini (1892—1958), Italian mathematician
Alberto María de Agostini (1893-1960), Italian priest and explorer in Patagonia and Tierra del Fuego
Linda Agostini (1905 – c. 1934), British murder victim
Philippe Agostini (1910-2001), French cinematographer, director and screenwriter 
Jorge Agostini (1910–1955), Cuban fencer
Lucio Agostini (1913–1996), Italian-Canadian composer and conductor
Peter Agostini (1913-1993), American sculptor
Dante Agostini (1921–1980), Italian-born French drummer and drumming teacher
Dante Agostini (canoeist) (born 1923), Italian sprint canoeist
Duilio Agostini (1926–2008), Italian Grand Prix motorcycle road racer
Mike Agostini (born 1935), Trinidad and Tobago athlete
Giacomo Agostini (born 1942), Italian motorcycle racer
Getulio Agostini (1943–1990), Venezuelan botanist and professor
Agostini Di Bartolomei (1955-1994), Italian football midfielder
Doris de Agostini (born 1958), Swiss alpine skier
Luigi De Agostini (born 1961), Italian football player
Massimo Agostini (born 1964), Italian football player
Alessandro Agostini (born 1979), Italian football player
Fanny Agostini (born 1988), French journalist and television presenter for France 3
Mauro Agostini (born 1989), Argentine professional racing cyclist
Stefano Agostini (cyclist) (born 1989), Italian professional road cyclist
Riccardo Agostini (born 1994), Italian racing driver

Italian-language surnames
Patronymic surnames
Surnames from given names